Liu Fu may refer to:

 Liu Fu (prince) (劉輔; died 84), Eastern Han Dynasty prince, son of Emperor Guangwu
 Liu Fu (Yuanying) (劉馥; died 208), style name Yuanying (元穎), Eastern Han Dynasty politician
 Liu Fu (cyclist) (born 1957), Chinese Olympic cyclist
 Liu Bannong or Liu Fu (劉復, 1891–1934), Chinese linguist and poet